Mohammad Kart (born ) is an Iranian film director, screenwriter and actor. In 2020, he won the Crystal Simorgh for Audience Choice of Best Film for making the film Drown at the 38th Fajr Film Festival.

Filmography

Film

Web

Television

Documentary

Awards and nominations

References

External links 

 

1986 births
Living people
People from Shiraz
People from Tehran
Iranian documentary film producers
Iranian male film actors
Iranian documentary film directors
All articles with unsourced statements